The Albert Swain Bryson House, known locally as Hall of the Pines, is a historic house in Franklin, North Carolina.  The -story brick and frame house occupies a prominent site on Pine Lane overlooking Main Street.  It was built in the 1870s for Albert Swain Bryson, a prominent local farmer and magistrate.  The house is a regionally rare example of vernacular Gothic and Italianate style, with steeply-pitched gables decorated with paired brackets, and a two-level porch with delicate sawn balustrade.

The house was listed on the National Register of Historic Places in 1984.

See also
National Register of Historic Places listings in Macon County, North Carolina

References

Houses on the National Register of Historic Places in North Carolina
Houses completed in 1875
Houses in Macon County, North Carolina
National Register of Historic Places in Macon County, North Carolina